Sylvia Moss is an American poet.

She lives in Larchmont, New York.

Awards
 1988 Whiting Award
 1986 National Poetry Series, for Cities in Motion

Works

Six Poets (Abel, 1999)

References

External links
Profile at The Whiting Foundation
 

Year of birth missing (living people)
Living people
American women poets
Place of birth missing (living people)
21st-century American women